Halieutopsis kawaii, also known as Kawai's deepsea batfish is a species of fish in the family Ogcocephalidae.

It is found in the waters of Taiwan  and Indonesia.

Etymology
The fish is named for the author's friend, Toshio Kawai, of the Hokkaido University, who collected the paratypes of the species and made them available for this study.

References

Ogcocephalidae
Marine fish genera
Fish described in 2022
Taxa named by Hans Hsuan-Ching Ho